Joaquim Alberto da Silva (4 March 1974 – 15 April 2019), known as Quinzinho, was an Angolan professional footballer who played as a striker.

He spent the vast majority of his career in Portugal and China, amassing Primeira Liga totals of 123 matches and 28 goals over seven seasons in the former country. He also competed in Spain.

Quinzinho appeared for Angola in two Africa Cup of Nations tournaments.

Club career
Born in Luanda, Portuguese Angola, Quinzinho signed with FC Porto in 1995 from local club Atlético Sport Aviação. He was sparingly played during his spell at the former club as he was behind Domingos Paciência first and later Mário Jardel, and was also loaned to fellow Primeira Liga sides U.D. Leiria and Rio Ave FC.

After a period in Spain with Rayo Vallecano, Quinzinho returned to Portugal where, although still registered with Porto, he represented S.C. Farense, C.D. Aves and F.C. Alverca in quick succession, always in the top division. In January 2003, after half a season with G.D. Estoril Praia in the lower leagues, he moved to China where he stayed for five years, appearing for teams in both the Super League and League One.

International career
Quinzinho earned 40 caps for Angola, during seven years and two months. He made his debut on 4 September 1994, in a 2–0 home win against Namibia for the 1996 African Cup of Nations qualifiers.

Quinzinho was picked for the squad at the 1996 and 1998 African Cup of Nations, scoring a combined three goals as both tournaments ended in group stage elimination.

International goals
Scores and results list Angola's goal tally first, score column indicates score after each Quinzinho goal.

Personal life and death
Quinzinho's son, Alexandre, is also a footballer. Born in Portugal, he played for them at youth level.

On 15 April 2019 Quinzinho, at the time working for U.D. Vilafranquense as a physiotherapist, suffered a heart attack after jogging in Alverca do Ribatejo and died shortly after, at the age of 45. He was buried in Lisbon.

Honours
Porto
Primeira Liga: 1995–96, 1998–99

Xiamen Lanshi
China League One: 2005

References

External links

1974 births
2019 deaths
Footballers from Luanda
Black Portuguese sportspeople
Angolan footballers
Association football forwards
Angola international footballers
1996 African Cup of Nations players
1998 African Cup of Nations players
Girabola players
Atlético Sport Aviação players
C.R. Caála players
Primeira Liga players
Segunda Divisão players
FC Porto players
U.D. Leiria players
Rio Ave F.C. players
S.C. Farense players
C.D. Aves players
F.C. Alverca players
G.D. Estoril Praia players
La Liga players
Rayo Vallecano players
Chinese Super League players
China League One players
Guangzhou F.C. players
Xiamen Blue Lions players
Pudong Zobon players
Angolan expatriate footballers
Expatriate footballers in Portugal
Expatriate footballers in Spain
Expatriate footballers in China
Angolan expatriate sportspeople in Portugal
Angolan expatriate sportspeople in Spain
Angolan expatriate sportspeople in China